Sugarevo is a village in the municipality of Sandanski, in Blagoevgrad Province, Bulgaria.

References

Villages in Blagoevgrad Province